Bird Saddle is one of three prominent snow saddles on Ross Island, this one at about  between Mount Bird and Mount Erebus.

References
 

Mountain passes of the Ross Dependency
Landforms of Ross Island